Harry Holbert Turney-High (1899–1982) was an American anthropologist and author who studied primitive war and conflict. He was a professor of anthropology at University of South Carolina and also a colonel in the military police in the United States Army Reserve.  He based his theory on the concept of military horizon, which is the point where a society evolves from a primitive form of war towards a more complex one. This evolution depends not only on traditionally studied mechanism, such as climate or access to resources, but mainly on the organizational ability of any given society.

Selected works
 Primitive War: Its Practices and Concepts (South Carolina: University of South Carolina Press, 2nd edition (1991)) 
 The Military: The Theory of Land Warfare As Behavioral Science ([Christopher Pub House] ; (1981)) 
 (reprinted 1998,)

References

1899 births
1982 deaths
United States Army reservists
University of South Carolina faculty
20th-century American anthropologists
20th-century American male writers